Microloxia herbaria, the herb emerald, is a moth of the family Geometridae. The species was first described by Jacob Hübner in 1808. It is a widespread species that can be found along the Mediterranean region, southern Europe, central Asia towards southern Asia including India, Pakistan and Sri Lanka and to the Russian Far East.

Biology
It is a green moth with white irrorations (speckles). Host plants of the caterpillar include Artemisia, Thymus capitatus, Mentha suaveolens, Vernonia centaureoides, Helichrysum stoechas and Teucrium polium.

Subspecies
Three subspecies are recognized.
Microloxia herbaria advolata Eversmann, 1837
Microloxia herbaria indecretata Walker, 1863
Microloxia herbaria ruficornis Warren, 1897

References

Moths of Europe
Moths of Asia
Moths described in 1808